The Powder River Examiner, originally established in October 1918 as the Broadus Independent, is the only newspaper printed in Powder River County, Montana, and is located in the county seat of Broadus.

History
 The Broadus Independent was first published in Broadus, Montana in October 1918, and continued until February 1919.
 From March 6, 1919 until April 17, 1919, the paper was published in Olive, Montana as the Olive Branch.
 The Broadus Independent was published weekly from April 24, 1919 until 1935.
 The Powder River County Examiner replaced the Broadus Independent in 1935, beginning publication and continuing weekly until 1965.
 In 1965 the newspaper's name was shortened to Powder River Examiner, and remains that today.

Preceding Titles
 Broadus Independent, Broadus, Montana, October 1918 – February 1919.
 Olive Branch, Olive, Montana, March 6, 1919 – April 17, 1919.
 Broadus Independent, Broadus, Montana, April 24, 1919 – 1935.
 Powder River County Examiner, Broadus, Montana, 1935 – 1965.
 Powder River Examiner, Broadus, Montana, 1965 – current.

Notable contributors
 Billy Stuver, (current editor)

References

Newspapers published in Montana
Publications established in 1918
1918 establishments in Montana
Powder River County, Montana